Brutally Normal is an American sitcom television series that starred Mike Damus and aired on The WB. The series premiered on January 24, 2000 with two back-to-back episodes later airing along with Zoe... A total of eight episodes were produced with only five of those episodes airing with the show being canceled on February 14, 2000.

Premise
The series revolved around Pooh (Mike Damus), a teenage boy with a group of diverse friends. Anna (Lea Moreno) is a foreign exchange student and Russell (Eddie Kaye Thomas) is his wise-cracking best friend all going through their senior year at Wacker H. Normal High School. Many of the show's story lines dealt with surreal situations that the group would get into hence the series name.

Cast
 Mike Damus as Robert "Pooh" Cutler
 Lea Moreno as Anna Pricova
 Eddie Kaye Thomas as Russell Wise
 Tangie Ambrose as Dru
 Antwon Tanner as Shaheem
 Joanna Pacula as Gogi Pricova

Episodes

References

External links
 
 

2000s American high school television series
2000s American single-camera sitcoms
2000s American teen sitcoms
2000s American sitcoms
2000 American television series debuts
2000 American television series endings
English-language television shows
Television series about teenagers
Television series by ABC Studios
The WB original programming